Andre Maddox (born October 8, 1982) is an American football defensive back.

Pro career
Drafted in the fifth round of the 2005 NFL Draft by the New York Jets as a special teams player, Maddox was reunited with college teammate Jerricho Cotchery, who had been drafted by the Jets the previous year. However, he suffered a torn anterior cruciate ligament in training camp his rookie year. Maddox was released by the team on September 2, 2006 following training camp, and was later added to the Jets' practice squad on December 13.

He signed with the Minnesota Vikings and was allocated to play for the Rhein Fire of NFL Europa. On April 3, 2008, Maddox signed with the Toronto Argonauts of the Canadian Football League.

Personal
He spoke at the funeral for his longtime friend and high school teammate, Sean Taylor.

References

External links
Just Sports Stats
Draft profile

1982 births
African-American players of Canadian football
American football safeties
Living people
NC State Wolfpack football players
Toronto Argonauts players
New York Jets players